Satheesh Kurup (born 7 November 1981) is an Indian cinematographer who works in Malayalam cinema.

Early life

Career
Satheesh made his debut with Anwar (2010). His well-known films include Pranayam (2011), Jawan of Vellimala (2012), Kalimannu (2013), Ladies and Gentleman (2013), Salala Mobiles (2014), Mr. Fraud (2014), and Haram (2015). He was an assistant cinematographer to Jibu Jacob and Amal Neerad.

Filmography

References

External links
 

1981 births
Living people
Malayalam film cinematographers
Cinematographers from Kerala
21st-century Indian photographers
People from Changanassery